Robert A. Williams (January 18, 1917 – December 28, 2000), nicknamed "Cotton", was an American baseball pitcher and infielder in the Negro leagues. He played from 1943 to 1951, playing mostly with the Newark Eagles.

References

External links
 and Seamheads
NLBPA.com

1917 births
2000 deaths
Baseball pitchers
Newark Eagles players
Houston Eagles players
Philadelphia Stars players
Baseball players from Maryland
20th-century African-American sportspeople